Onnebetsu Dam  is a rockfill dam located in Hokkaido Prefecture in Japan. The dam is used for irrigation. The catchment area of the dam is 40.1 km2. The dam impounds about 136  ha of land when full and can store 9312 thousand cubic meters of water. The construction of the dam was completed in 1985.

References

Dams in Hokkaido